Nicolás Delgado, O.F.M. (died 25 November 1698) was a Roman Catholic prelate who served as Bishop of Nicaragua (1687–1698).

Biography
Nicolás Delgado was ordained a priest in the Order of Friars Minor. On 2 May 1687, he was appointed during the papacy of Pope Innocent XI as Bishop of Nicaragua and installed on 22 December 1688. He served as Bishop of Nicaragua until his death on 25 November 1698.

References

External links and additional sources
 (for Chronology of Bishops) 
 (for Chronology of Bishops) 

17th-century Roman Catholic bishops in Nicaragua
Bishops appointed by Pope Innocent XI
1698 deaths
Franciscan bishops
Roman Catholic bishops of León in Nicaragua